Bumiputera or Bumiputra, which is a Malay word, comes from the Sanskrit word Bhumiputra which may be transliterated as "son of earth" or "son of the soil" (Bhūmi; भूमि = earth; putra = son). It has different definitions in Brunei and Malaysia:

 Bumiputera (Brunei)
 Bumiputera (Malaysia)
 Bumiputera (Indonesia)